Manathodu Mazhaikalam is a 2006 Tamil language drama film directed by Arputhan, that stars Shaam, Nithya Das, Jayasurya, and Sameksha.

Plot 
Siva (Shaam) and Sathya (Nithya Das) are college mates and good friends who always look out for each other. Their friendship continues even after their college days. Siva's and Sathya's parents mistake their friendship for an affair. The two refuse and make it clear that they are platonic friends with oneness in their thoughts. In the course of time, Siva marries Sruthy (Sameksha) and Sathya marries Karthik (Jayasurya). Sruthy soon becomes pregnant but dies of childbirth complications. Siva is left to raise his son on his own. Many years pass, and Siva's son begins to treat him badly, leaving him destitute. At the same time, Karthik informs Siva that Sathya is on her deathbed due to heart problems. In due course of time, Sathya dies. The film ends as Karthik and Siva, both widowers, walk together, vowing to remain good friends for the remainder of their lives.

Cast 

 Shaam as Siva
 Nithya Dass as Sathya
 Jaisurya as Karthik
 Shamiksha as Sruthy
 T. P. Gajendran as a professor
 Vinod Raj as Siva's father
 Boys Rajan as Sathya's father
 Shyam Ganesh as Siva's son
 Malavika as Hemalatha
 Rindhiya as Siva's daughter-in-law
 Sai Dhanshika (uncredited) as a college student
 Chaams (uncredited) as an employee

Production 
The film is directed by Arputhan, who previously directed Arputham (2002). Shaam veered away from his chocolate boy looks and portrayed an old man at the beginning and end of this film.

Soundtrack 
Soundtrack was composed by Karthik Raja. The lyrics are written by Na. Muthukumar.

"Welcome To" – Sukhwinder Singh, Rahul Seth
"Unakkum Enakkum" – Ranjith, Bobby, Priya, Saravanan
"Kangal Theduthey" – Sadhana Sargam, Jassie Gift
"Pani Vizhum Kaalam" – Karthik Raja, Madhushree, Premji Amaran
"Aayiram Vanavil" – Sadhana Sargam, Madhu Balakrishnan
"Kangal Theduthey" – Sadhana Sargam, Jassie Gift

Release 
A critic from Oneindia noted that "Overall, Manathodu Mazhaikalam is worth seeing as it has a certain truth and universality to it". A critic from Ananda Vikatan criticized the film's story while praised the background score. Malini Mannath of Chennai Online opined that "It's a feel-good film, which would have felt better, and more engaging, with a tighter script and a firmer grip on the narration".

References

External links 

2006 films
2000s Tamil-language films
Indian drama films
Indian buddy films
Films scored by Karthik Raja